MV Aratika was a roll-on/roll-off train ferry that operated on the Interislander between Wellington and Picton in New Zealand from 1974 until 1999.

The Ministry for Culture & Heritage gives Aratika as a Māori-language word meaning direct path.

History
Aratika was built by Chantiers Dubigeon in France for the New Zealand Railways Department to operate between Wellington and Picton. She was built to carry rail freight only Launched in November 1973, the ship arrived in Wellington in June 1974.

In 1976 she was converted by Hongkong United Dockyards to carry passengers and private vehicles as well as railway wagons. This increased her passenger capacity from 10 to 840, and the car space from four to 70.

In 1999, she was sold to MBRS Lines in the Philippines and served as MV Virgin Mary until 2008, when sold to Indian ship-breakers.

References

External links
Aratika at New Zealand Maritime Record

Cook Strait ferries
Ferries of the Philippines
Ships built by Chantiers Dubigeon
1973 ships